Fred Lee McAfee (born June 20, 1968) is a former American football running back who played for the New Orleans Saints, Arizona Cardinals, Pittsburgh Steelers and Tampa Bay Buccaneers of the National Football League (NFL). He has a daughter and son.

McAfee is currently the Director of Player Development at the New Orleans Saints.

Early years
McAfee attended Philadelphia High School (Mississippi) and was a student and a letterman in football & track. In football, he won All-District honors. In track, he was a two-time state champion in the pole vault. McAfee graduated high school in 1986. Fred is also a first cousin to legendary running back Marcus Dupree, and was the Philadelphia High School Football team's ball boy during Dupree's renowned years. A person featured in the ESPN "30 for 30" series about Marcus Dupree says that a young McAfee would give away or sell Dupree's torn game jerseys.

McAfee graduated with a degree in mass communication from Mississippi College in Clinton, Mississippi and played for the Choctaws football team in  Division II. He set school records for rushing yards, attempts and rushing touchdowns. He led the Choctaws to the 1989 Gulf South Conference football champion, which was later vacated as punishment for recruiting violations, and earned All-American (D-II) honors.

Pro career 
McAfee was drafted by the Saints in the 1991 NFL Draft. He is the first player in Saints franchise history to be on the roster for three (1991, 2000, 2006) of the team's division titles. The 1991 season was his most prolific, offensively, as he rushed for a career-high 109 times for 494 yards and two touchdowns.

During the 1994 season, McAfee played for the Arizona Cardinals for seven games, then was released. On November 9, 1994, McAfee signed a contract with the Pittsburgh Steelers, who he would play for until the 1999 season, where he signed with the Kansas City Chiefs. While he was with the Steelers, he played in Super Bowl XXX, which the Steelers lost to the Dallas Cowboys 27–17.

However, less than a month after signing with the Chiefs, he was released. On December 28, 1999, McAfee signed with the Tampa Bay Buccaneers. During the 1999 season, McAfee played in only one game, and in October 2000, McAfee signed with the team that drafted him back in 1991, the New Orleans Saints. Throughout his second stint with the Saints, McAfee re-signed and declared free agency numerous times with the Saints. He was elected to go to the Pro Bowl in 2002 for his special team efforts. He was also known around the team for his tremendous work ethic, being a leader on and off the football field, and bringing a camaraderie to the locker room. During his second stint with the Saints, for 6 seasons, McAfee had only seven attempts for 117 yards. On August 28, 2006, McAfee was cut by the New Orleans Saints, thus making him a free agent eligible to sign with any NFL team. McAfee was re-signed by the Saints on November 21, 2006. On December 27, McAfee was waived by the Saints. Two days later, he was re-signed by the Saints and scored a touchdown on December 31, 2006 against the Carolina Panthers. This was McAfee's first NFL touchdown since October 26, 1998, which was on a blocked punt and his first rushing/offensive touchdown since September 10, 1995,

A few weeks later, on January 10, 2007, McAfee was placed on the Injured Reserve list by the Saints, reportedly to make roster room for newly signed place kicker Billy Cundiff. On May 25, 2007, the Saints announced they would hire him as director of player programs.

Career statistics
Rushing statistics 

Receiving statistics

Kickoff return statistics

References

External links
 New Orleans Saints profile

1968 births
Living people
American football running backs
Arizona Cardinals players
Mississippi College Choctaws football players
New Orleans Saints executives
New Orleans Saints players
Pittsburgh Steelers players
Tampa Bay Buccaneers players
National Conference Pro Bowl players
People from Philadelphia, Mississippi
Players of American football from Mississippi